Francois Louw (born 15 June 1985) is a South African former professional rugby union player. He won 76 international caps for South Africa, and was part of the team that won the 2019 Rugby World Cup.

Early life
Louw was born in Cape Town and is the grandson of the former South African international Jan Pickard. He attended Bishops College in Cape Town and studied rugby at the University of Stellenbosch.

Playing career
He represented the Stormers in Super Rugby, having made his debut during the 2008 season. Louw was part of the Stormers team that lost the 2010 Super 14 Final to the Bulls.

On 12 July 2011 it was announced that Louw signed for Bath Rugby on a 3-year deal.

International
Following the Super 14 season, Louw made his debut for South Africa against Wales at the Millennium Stadium in Cardiff. He played the entire game as South Africa won 34–31. Louw was selected for South Africa's next match, against France at his home ground, Newlands Stadium in Cape Town. Louw scored the last of five tries, helping South Africa to a 42–17 victory. After taking part in South Africa's victorious two-match series against Italy, including a try in the first Test, Louw made his Tri Nations debut in July 2010. It was the first time Louw experienced defeat as a Springbok, with New Zealand winning the game 32–12.

He has become a mainstay in the Springbok side, becoming the first choice openside flank under the reign of Heyneke Meyer. He had the second most turnovers won at the 2015 Rugby World Cup with 13. He has also shown strong running and some skilful play. In 2013, against the All Blacks at Ellis Park, he made a strong run then an offload in the tackle to set up Bryan Habana for a try.

Louw was named in South Africa's squad for the 2019 Rugby World Cup. South Africa won the tournament, defeating England in the final.

Notes

References

External links 
 
Bath rugby profile
MyPlayers profile

1985 births
Living people
South African rugby union players
South Africa international rugby union players
South African people of Dutch descent
Stormers players
Western Province (rugby union) players
Bath Rugby players
Rugby union flankers
Rugby union players from Cape Town
Afrikaner people
South African expatriate rugby union players
South African expatriate sportspeople in England
Expatriate rugby union players in England